John Priestley may refer to:
 John Priestley (footballer), Scottish footballer
 John Gillies Priestley, British physiologist
 J. B. Priestley (John Boynton Priestley), English writer
 Jack Priestley (John S. Priestley), American cinematographer